New York is a lost 1916 American silent comedy-drama film directed by George Fitzmaurice and starring Florence Reed. It is taken from a play by William J. Hurlbut. The film was distributed by the Pathé Exchange company.

Cast
Florence Reed as Nora Nelson, later Mrs. King
Fania Marinoff as Edna Macey, The Chorus Girl
John Miltern as Oliver King
Jessie Ralph as Mrs. Macey
Forrest Winant as Wendell King

Reception
Like many American films of this  time period, New York was subject to cuts by city and state film censorship boards. For example, in 1918 the Chicago Board of Censors issued an Adults Only permit for the film and required a cut, in Reel 2, of the two intertitles "Edna enjoys the luxuries that King provides her" and "And thus Oliver King becomes a benedict", and, Reel 3, two views of a nude model.

References

External links

1916 films
American silent feature films
Lost American films
Films directed by George Fitzmaurice
American films based on plays
American black-and-white films
Pathé Exchange films
1910s English-language films
Films with screenplays by Ouida Bergère
1916 comedy-drama films
1916 lost films
Lost comedy-drama films
1910s American films
Silent American comedy-drama films